Maraner Pare was a Bengali drama film directed by Satish Dasgupta. This movie was released on 1 Jan 1954 under the banner of Himalayan Art Producers. The music direction was done by Sargam Unit. This movie stars Uttam Kumar, Suchitra Sen, Sambhu Mitra, Ajit Bandyopadhyay and Dhiraj Bhattacharya in the lead roles.

Plot

Cast
 Suchitra Sen - Tanima
 Uttam Kumar - Dr. Ashok
 Pranoti Ghosh - Smritikana
 Ajit Bandyopadhyay - Dr. Paresh Banerjee
 Dhiraj Bhattacharya -  Ahindra alias Rai Bahadur Bhujanga Choudhury
 Biren Chattapadhyay - Dr Ghosh, Chief Doctor
 Panchanan Bhattacharya
 Nilima Das - Bijli Bai
 Bharati Devi - Tapati
 Sambhu Mitra - Gurudas
 Joy Narayan Mukherjee

References

External links
 

1954 films
Bengali-language Indian films
1954 drama films
1950s Bengali-language films
Indian drama films
Indian black-and-white films